Living Springs is an unincorporated rural community in Centre Wellington Township, Wellington County, Ontario, Canada.  The settlement was part of West Garafraxa Township until 1999.

Irvine Creek flows through the settlement.

History

A post office was located in Living Springs from 1885 to 1914.

The settlement had a school in 1908, and semi-weekly stage coach service in 1910.

A chapter of the Federated Women's Institutes of Ontario was located in Living Springs from 1925 to 1995.

Prior to the 1930s, a shingle mill was located at the settlement.

References

Communities in Wellington County, Ontario